Sayali Bhagat is an Indian actress and former beauty queen. She competed in Femina Miss India 2004 and won the title of Femina Miss India World.

Early life
She studied at Fravashi Academy, Nasik, and completed her graduation in BMS (Bachelor of Management Studies) from Alkesh Dinesh Mody Institute for Financial and Management Studies.

Career
Her initial modeling assignments were for Dentzz, SNDT College show and Swarovski gems fashion show. The Train: Some Lines Should Never Be Crossed was her first Hindi film, co-starring Emraan Hashmi and Geeta Basra. The movie was released on 8 July 2007.
She also appeared as a journalist from Singapore, who pretends to interview Indian cricketer Rahul Dravid on the show MTV Bakra. In 2009, she was in the Hindi movie Paying Guests, opposite Javed Jaffrey.

She also made an appearance on the MTV Bakra programme as a Singaporean journalist who pretends to interview Indian cricketer Rahul Dravid. In 2009, she acted in the Hindi movie Paying Guests, opposite Javed Jaffrey.

Personal life
On 10 December 2013, Bhagat married Haryana based businessman Navneet Pratap Singh.

Filmography

References

External links

 

21st-century Indian actresses
Actresses in Hindi cinema
Actresses in Kannada cinema
Actresses from Maharashtra
Actresses in Punjabi cinema
Actresses in Tamil cinema
Actresses in Telugu cinema
Female models from Maharashtra
Femina Miss India winners
Indian film actresses
Living people
People from Nashik
Miss World 2004 delegates
Year of birth missing (living people)